Roh Tae-woo (4 December 1932 – 26 October 2021) was a South Korean politician and army general who served as the sixth president of South Korea from 1988 to 1993. He was the first democratically elected president of South Korea. 

Roh was a close ally and friend of Chun Doo-hwan, the predecessor leader of the country who ruled as an unelected military dictator from 1980 to 1988, and unofficially since 1979. In 1996, both leaders were sentenced for their roles in orchestrating coups as well as their subsequent human rights abuses such as the Gwangju Massacre, but was pardoned the following year by Kim Young-sam on advice of president-elect Kim Dae-jung.

He was a leader of the Democratic Justice Party from 1987 to 1990 and was known for having passed the June 29 Declaration in 1987 as the leader of the party. Roh died on 26 October 2021, at the age of 88.

Early life and education
Roh was born on 4 December 1932 in Daegu. His ancestry could be traced from Jinan, Shandong. He is the 16th generation descendant of Noh Sa-sin who was a civil minister and scholar during early Joseon period. Noh Sa-sin is 6th generation descendant of the late Goryeo period bureaucrat Noh Jin. His father, a low-echelon civil officer in the district, died in a car accident when Roh was seven years old. With his uncle's help, Roh first enrolled at the Taegu Technical School but transferred to the local Kyongbuk High School where he was an above-average student. Roh befriended Chun Doo-hwan while in high school in Taikyū.

Military service
During the Korean War (1950–1953), Roh joined the South Korean army as an enlisted conscript in an artillery unit, he joins singer Song Hae. He was promoted to Sergeant Cannoneer of an M114 155 mm howitzer gun line.

He later entered the Korean Military Academy, completing it in the first class of the four-year program, he graduated in February 1954 with a Bachelor of Science degree and a commission as an Army 2nd Lieutenant in the 11th class of the Korea Military Academy (KMA).

A commissioned officer in the infantry from 1954, Roh rose steadily through the ranks and fought in the Vietnam War, first in 1968 as a lieutenant colonel and battalion commander, later was promoted to major general and the commander of White Horse Division in 1979. A member of the Hanahoe, a secret military group, he gave critical support to a coup later that year in which Chun became the de facto ruler of South Korea. Roh was a military general when he helped Chun lead troops to the Gwangju Democratization Movement in 1980.

Roh held several key army posts such as Commander of the Capital Security Command in 1979 and Commander of the Defense Security Command in 1980.

When Roh first joined the military, his surname was transcribed in English as "No." He later changed it to "Roh" to avoid the negative connotations of "No" in English.

Political career

Cabinet minister
Following his retirement from the Korean Army in July 1981, Roh accepted President Chun's offer of the post of Minister of State for National Security and Foreign Affairs. Later, he served as Sports Minister, Home Affairs Minister, President of the Seoul Olympics Organizing Committee, and in 1985, chairman of the ruling Democratic Justice Party. Most notably, he oversaw preparations for the 1988 Summer Olympics in Seoul, which he officially declared open.

June 29 Declaration and run for presidency

Despite his involvement in the 12 December 1979 coup d'état against then-President Choi Kyu-hah and the bloody military crackdown of dissidents in the Gwangju Uprising of 18–27 May 1980 and with an eye on the Blue House in the upcoming 1987 presidential elections, Roh began working to distance himself from the unpopular Chun government. The reason was that Roh worked to carry out his own agenda for democratic reform. By agreeing to meeting the demands of the political opposition in terms of political reforms with his eight-point proposal including direct election of the President, Roh successfully upstaged Chun and boosted his own image as a reformer.

In June 1987, Chun named Roh as the presidential candidate of the ruling Democratic Justice Party. This was widely perceived as handing Roh the presidency, and triggered large pro-democracy rallies in Seoul and other cities in the 1987 June Democracy Movement.

In response, Roh made a speech on 29 June promising a wide program of reforms. Chief among them were a new, more democratic constitution and popular election of the president. In the election, the two leading opposition figures, Kim Young-sam and Kim Dae-jung (both of whom later became presidents), were unable to overcome their differences and split the vote, in spite of the first female presidential candidate, Hong Sook-ja in South Korean electoral history history withdrawing from the race to support Kim Young-sam against Roh. This enabled Roh to win by a narrow margin with 36.6% of the vote and become the country's first cleanly elected president on 16 December 1987.

Presidency (1988–1993)
Roh was inaugurated as president on 25 February 1988. For the first time, the ceremony was held outside the National Assembly. Subsequent presidents have been inaugurated at the same location.

Roh's rule was notable for hosting the Seoul Olympics in 1988 and for his foreign policy of Nordpolitik, which represented a major break from previous administrations. True to his word, he remained committed to democratic reforms and was steadfast in the push toward political and socio-economic reforms at home. Democratization of politics, economic "growth with equity," and national reunification were the three policy goals publicly stated by the Roh administration.

However, in 1992, Roh's government sealed up a cave on Mount Halla where the remains of the Jeju uprising massacre victims had been discovered, continuing a series of coverups by successive administrations on the truth of the uprising.

Merging of political parties in 1990
In order to overcome the paralysis of governing due to lack of majority support in the National Assembly, the Roh government sought to attain "a grand compromise" in partisan politics. A party merger was announced on 22 January 1990 in an attempt to accomplish this political objective. The ruling Democratic Justice Party merged with two opposition parties, Kim Young-sam's Reunification and Democracy Party and Kim Jong-pil's New Democratic Republican Party. The new established Democratic Liberal Party, which commanded a more than two-thirds majority in the legislature, sought to establish political stability so as to enable socio-economic progress. However, the merger was fraught with factional infighting, undermining his administration's handling on national affairs.

Foreign policy

He met with President Corazon Aquino for a series of talks between the Philippines and South Korea for economic, social, and cultural ties, supporting the Filipino boxer Leopoldo Serantes in the Olympics, and to discuss unification talks to end North Korea's hostilities after the Korean War.

During his administration, Roh's stance as President was very active in diplomacy. Successfully hosting the 24th Summer Olympics in Seoul in his first year in office was a major accomplishment, followed by his active diplomacy, including his address before the United Nations General Assembly in October 1988, his meeting with U.S. President George H. W. Bush, and delivering a speech before a joint session of the U.S. Congress. He also conducted a five-nation European visit in December 1989.

On 7 July 1988, he launched an aggressive foreign policy initiative called the Northern Diplomacy, or Nordpolitik, which brought about benefits and rewards to his government. In 1989, Seoul established diplomatic relations with Hungary and Poland, followed by diplomatic ties with Yugoslavia, Romania, Czechoslovakia, Bulgaria, and Mongolia in 1990. South Korea's trade with the People's Republic of China steadily increased, reaching the $3.1 billion mark at the same time South Korea's trade with the Eastern Bloc nations and the Soviet Union increased to $800 million. Seoul and Moscow exchanged full consular general's offices in 1990. Roh's moves left North Korea more isolated and was a dramatic and historic turning point of South Korea’s diplomatic goals.

On 4 June 1990, Roh met with Mikhail Gorbachev, President of the Soviet Union, during a visit to the United States. The meeting ended 42 years of official silence between the two countries and paved the way for improved diplomatic relations. Roh later visited the Soviet Union in 1991.

North Korean relations
The Nordpolitik policy also proposed the interim development of a "Korean Community", which was similar to a North Korean proposal for a confederation.

From 4 to 7 September 1990, high-level talks were held in Seoul, at the same time that the North was protesting about the Soviet Union normalizing relations with the South. In December 1991 both states made an accord, the Agreement on Reconciliation, Non-Aggression, Exchange and Cooperation, pledging non-aggression and cultural and economic exchanges. They also agreed on prior notification of major military movements and established a military hotline, and working on replacing the armistice with a "peace regime". Today, the agreement has been praised for forming a foundation for cross-border exchanges and cooperation.

In January 1992, North and South Korea also signed the Joint Declaration of the Denuclearization of the Korean Peninsula, although the North subsequently reneged and pursued its own nuclear weapons program. This coincided with the admission of both North and South Korea into the United Nations. Meanwhile, on 25 March 1991, a unified Korean team, for the first time, used the Korean Unification Flag at the World Table Tennis Competition in Japan, and on 6 May 1991, a unified team competed at the World Youth Football Competition in Portugal.

Economy and infrastructure
Roh's emphasis on "economic growth with equity," although well received by the public, led to the dwindling in the annual economic growth rate from the high of 12.3 percent in 1988 to 6.7 percent in 1989. As labor strikes and demands for higher wages intensified, the Roh government imposed an austerity plan to keep South Korea's export-oriented economy more competitive internationally. However, pursuit of higher wages in the wake of the strikes and the appreciation of the South Korean won in value against the U.S. dollar made South Korean products less competitive internationally.

However, among his positive legacies were the cancellation of debt in rural areas, the construction of 2 million new houses and establishing public land ownership for the public interest. Among his lasting legacies is the building of large-scale national projects such as Incheon International Airport which opened in 2001 (and is now one of the largest and busiest airports in the world) and the Korea Train Express (KTX) high speed rail system which opened in 2004, both of which began construction under his administration in 1992.

Post-presidency (1993–2021)
Barred from running for a second term in 1992 (the 1987 constitution retained the previous ban on reelection), Roh left office on 24 February 1993.

Trial, jail sentence and pardon
In 1993, Roh's successor Kim Young-sam led an anti-corruption campaign that investigated Roh and Chun Doo-hwan. Kim had previously merged his party with Roh's in a deal that enabled him to win the election. Kim's administration also officially recognised the 12 December incident as a coup.

In October 1995, Roh, in a tearful televised speech, publicly apologized for having illegally amassed hundreds of millions of dollars in secret political donations during his term as president. Roh was arrested in November 1995 on charges of bribery. The two former presidents were also later separately charged with mutiny and treason for their roles in the 1979 coup and the 1980 Gwangju massacre.

The "trial of the century", as described by the media, saw both convicted in August 1996 for treason, mutiny, and corruption; Chun was sentenced to death, later commuted to life imprisonment, while Roh's 22½-year jail sentence was reduced to 17 years on appeal. Both were released from prison in December 1997 and pardoned by Kim Young-sam on advice of president-elect Kim Dae-jung. Both Roh and Chun attended Kim Dae-jung's inauguration on 25 February 1998.

In March 2006, Roh was also stripped of 11 national honours which he previously received.

Roh finished repaying fines from his illegally gained wealth in 2013. In 2013, the remaining W24 billion (USD22 million) of a W262.9 billion fine for corruption in office was paid. He mostly stayed out of politics and maintained a low profile in retirement, and he continued to express remorse over his crimes until his death in 2021. In 2019, two years before Roh's death, his son went to Gwangju and visited the May 18th National Cemetery on behalf of his father. Roh's son visited the cemetery a second time in 2020, and he offered a flower wreath under his father's name. In contrast, his friend and predecessor, Chun Doo-hwan stopped repaying his remaining fine and did not show regret or remorse for his past actions.

Health (2002–2021)
Roh suffered from prostate cancer and received surgery in 2002. He also suffered from cerebellar atrophy and asthma. His son, Roh Jae-heon who is a lawyer based in the United States, said that Roh spent most of his final 10 years of his life in the hospital, while his daughter Roh Soh-yeong, an art museum director, said he was bedridden for the past 10 years and unable to speak or move his body.

Death and state funeral
Roh died in intensive care at the Seoul National University Hospital at 1:45pm KST on 26 October 2021, at the age of 88. His family released his last will and message, asking for forgiveness for his role in the 1979 military coup and 1980 Gwangju Uprising crackdown, and expressed his wish for future generations to be able to achieve reunification with North Korea which he could not achieve in his term.

In view of Roh's mixed and disputed legacy, the government decided to hold a state funeral for Roh following a debate within the national cabinet, in recognition of his "significant contributions to the nation's development". The decision was criticized by some, including survivors and victims' families of the Gwangju crackdown and members of the ruling liberal Democratic Party. The city of Gwangju and several other cities and provincial governments refused to raise flags half-mast or set up memorial altars for Roh in accordance with state funeral procedures. In Seoul, memorial altars saw a low turnout of mourners coming to pay their respects.

The scaled-down state funeral service, held in the middle of the COVID-19 pandemic, took place at Olympic Park, Seoul on 30 October, in recognition of the 1988 Summer Olympics which was successfully held there under his presidency. Prime Minister Kim Boo-kyum gave a eulogy. By law, Roh was not eligible for burial at a national cemetery because of his past criminal record and conviction. He was cremated and his ashes were interred at Unification Hill at Paju, a border town to North Korea.

He died about one month before former President Chun Doo-hwan died on 23 November 2021 from complications of blood cancer.

Honours
:
 Recipient of the Grand Order of Mugunghwa

Foreign honours
 :
 Honorary Recipient of the Order of the Crown of the Realm (1988)
:
 Honorary Knight Grand Cross of the Order of St Michael and St George
:
 Olympic Order

In popular culture
 Roh is portrayed by Seo In-seok in the 2005 MBC TV series 5th Republic.
 Park Moo-yeol, a fictional character modelled after Roh Tae-woo, is portrayed in a cameo by Kang Moon-kyung in 2021 JTBC drama series Snowdrop

See also

 History of South Korea

Further reading

Notes

References

External links

 
Presidents of South Korea
1932 births
2021 deaths
Korea Military Academy alumni
South Korean mass murderers
South Korean military personnel
Human rights abuses in South Korea
South Korean anti-communists
Converts to Protestantism from Buddhism
Conservatism in South Korea
People from Daegu
Gyoha No clan
Recipients of South Korean presidential pardons
Democratic Justice Party politicians
South Korean people of Chinese descent
Kyeongbuk High School alumni
Korean military personnel of the Vietnam War
Presidents of the Organising Committees for the Olympic Games
South Korean politicians convicted of crimes
20th-century South Korean politicians
South Korean prisoners and detainees
Politicians convicted of corruption
Members of the National Assembly (South Korea)
Heads of government who were later imprisoned
Honorary Knights Grand Cross of the Order of St Michael and St George
Recipients of the Olympic Order
People convicted of treason against South Korea